Linda Johnson (born c. 1959) is a Canadian politician who was an elected member to the Legislative Assembly of Alberta, representing the electoral district of Calgary-Glenmore, from 2012 to 2015.

Her interest in politics began during her high school days when she became active with the Progressive Conservative party. Her first involvement was as a volunteer for former MLA Dennis Anderson. She worked in Ottawa as an assistant to Harvie Andre, MP for Calgary-Centre. She returned to Calgary becoming constituency assistant for Jim Hawkes, MP for Calgary-West.

Johnson ran for the Calgary Ward 11 City Councilor seat in October 2017 but lost to Jeromy Farkas.

Electoral record

References

1950s births
Living people
People from Halifax, Nova Scotia
Politicians from Calgary
Progressive Conservative Association of Alberta MLAs
Women MLAs in Alberta
21st-century Canadian politicians
21st-century Canadian women politicians